The Punchline is a comedy club first opened in 1982 in Sandy Springs, Georgia.

The venue seats 270 people and presents shows five or more nights per week.  The club has hosted comedians as diverse as Robin Williams, Eddie Murphy, Dane Cook, and was the original performance venue of Jeff Foxworthy.

The clubhouse originally housed a carpet barn, and at one time was a country and western bar.  The decor of the country and western bar is still evident in the club today.  Ron DiNunzio and Dave Montesano were the original owners of the business. Today comedian manager Chris DiPetta, and Atlanta attorney Jamie Bendall are the owners of the comedy club. It closed down from its original location in Sandy Springs Ga. in March 2015. There was a hiatus of seven months with no brick and mortar location. It reopened in November 2015, now sharing a building with the Landmark Diner.

References

External links
 official site
 10 Gt Places to Watch Stand-up 
 Yelp Review - The Punchline

Comedy clubs in the United States
Event venues established in 1982
1982 establishments in Georgia (U.S. state)
Buildings and structures in Fulton County, Georgia
Sandy Springs, Georgia
Theatres in Georgia (U.S. state)
Tourist attractions in Fulton County, Georgia